Chang Gum-chol is a North Korean former footballer. He represented North Korea on at least nine occasions between 1988 and 1989.

Career statistics

International

References

External links
Chang Gum-chol at 11v11
Chang Gum-chol at 11v11

Date of birth unknown
Living people
North Korean footballers
North Korea international footballers
Association football midfielders
Year of birth missing (living people)